The Percy Society was a British text publication society. It was founded in 1840 and collapsed in 1852.

The Society was a scholarly collective, aimed at publishing limited-edition books of rare poems and songs. The president was Lady Braybrooke, and the twelve founding members of the committee included John Payne Collier, Thomas Crofton Croker, Thomas Wright, James Orchard Halliwell (treasurer), Charles Mackay, Edward Francis Rimbault (secretary) and William Chappell. Later members included  William Sandys, and Robert Bell.

The editors took care to print the text exactly as given in their sources. This was in contrast to their main inspiration, Thomas Percy, who often polished up vernacular text by adding lines or merging different incomplete versions. Like Percy, they omitted obscene songs and verses. Unlike Percy they tried to find the tunes to songs. John Payne Collier founded the Shakespeare Society in 1841.

Sources 
The members of the Percy Society drew on manuscripts and printed ephemera in the British Museum, the Bodleian Library, the Ashmolean Museum, the Pepys collection (Cambridge), The Douce collection (Oxford), and their own private collections. The committee would decide on the theme of the next publication, and send out the bound volumes to their subscription list. All members of the society were enthusiasts of Elizabethan drama. The society grew out of the Roxburghe Club. As well as reprinting so-called "Garlands" (collections of songs), they created their own compilations related to a particular region of Britain, or to a single subject such as Robin Hood.  There were 90 small publications and 31 larger volumes called "Early English Poetry, Ballads and Popular Literature".

Legacy 
In 1868 the Ballad Society was formed to do similar work, but was more focused on reprinting folksongs.

Of all the Percy Society publications, the ones that have been most frequently in print recently are the Irish folklore books by Thomas Crofton Croker. James Orchard Halliwell sold his personal collection of ballads, which became known as the Euing Collection, in the University of Glasgow. The "Crow Collection" at the University of Kent at Canterbury has an almost complete collection of Percy Society publications.

Publications

Early English Poetry, Ballads and Popular Literature of the Middle Ages

References

External links 

James Orchard Halliwell
Crocker's masque "Recollections of Old Christmas"
The Crow Collection

Percy Society
Percy Society
Book publishing companies of the United Kingdom
Medieval literature
English poetry
Ballads
Poetry anthologies
Organizations established in 1840
1852 disestablishments in the United Kingdom
Defunct learned societies of the United Kingdom
1840 establishments in the United Kingdom
Text publication societies